Jack Holden may refer to:

People
Jack Holden (actor), English actor
Jack Holden (athlete) (1907–2004), English long-distance runner
Jack Holden (footballer) (1910–1976), Australian rules footballer
Jack Holden (politician) (1921–2002), Australian politician

Fictional characters
Jack Holden (Home and Away), fictional character from the Australian soap opera Home and Away
Jack Holden (Three Men and a Baby)

See also
John Holden (disambiguation)
Holden (surname)